Ebonyi State, Nigeria has been led by governors and administrators since its creation in October 1996 from the old Abakaliki division of Enugu State and old Afikpo division of Abia State.

See also
States of Nigeria
List of state governors of Nigeria

References

Ebonyi
Governors